The Hino Dutro is a light commercial truck manufactured by Hino Motors. It is a rebadged version of the Toyota Dyna. Like the Dyna and its twin ToyoAce, the Dutro is built on the U300 platform for the standard cab, or U400 platform for the wide cab and offered in many different chassis type suitable for different purposes. The Dutro took over from the earlier Ranger 2 (and Ranger 3), a badge-engineered version of the Daihatsu Delta series. Outside of Japan, it is also known as the '300 series'. In North America, it has been marketed as the 'M Series' since the 2021 model year.

The Dutro is sold in Australia (currently it is rebadged as the 300 series), Chile, Colombia, Indonesia, Malaysia, Pakistan, the Philippines, Thailand, Sri Lanka and other countries in Latin America. As of 2008, the Dutro was available in Canada as the 'Hino 155'. Canadian models are built in Woodstock, Ontario from CKD kits imported from Japan.

The Latin-American models are built in Cota (Cundinamarca), Colombia by Hino Motor Manufacturing Colombia, from CKD kits imported from Japan. In some of these markets, however, complete assembled trucks are imported from Japan.
A new assembly plant is located in the town of Cota, in Colombia, built and financed by two partners: one local company and the Toyota group, the majority owner of the Hino subsidiary and the brand.

Emissions standards compliance is achieved with electronically controlled and water-cooled exhaust has recirculation technology (EGR) which uses a variable nozzle turbocharger to quickly build up pressure in its housing.

First generation (1999–2011)
The Dutro was introduced in May 1999 as a result of a joint development of the 7th Generation Toyota Dyna by Hino Motors and Toyota.

Japan 

 A wide range of variants of the first generation Dutro were offered in Japan, including the Wide Cab, Double Cab, hybrid electric, four-wheel-drive version, and the Route Van. Engine choices include the 3.7 liter 4B, 4.1 liter 15B-FTE, 4.0 liter N04C, 4.6 liter S05C, 4.7 liter J05D, 4.8 liter S05D, and 5.3 liter J05C.

Indonesia 

 The Dutro was introduced in Indonesia in 2002. Five models were offered: 125ST, 125LT, 125HT, 140GT, and 140HT. All are Standard Cab. The 125ST is 4-wheel short wheelbase model, the rest are 6-wheel long wheelbase models. The 125 models use the 4.0 liter N04C engine, while the 140 models are powered by 4.6 liter S05C engine.
 Starting from 2007 model year, with the government requirement that all vehicles must comply with Euro-2 emission regulation, Hino introduced 4 models with the modified W04D engine with inter-cooled turbocharger. The new models are 110SD, 110LD, 130MD, and 130HD.

Thailand 
 In Thailand, five models of the Dutro were offered: Dutro 300, 301, 340 (Standard Cab), 410 and 420 (Wide Cab).

Second generation (2011–present)

The second generation Dutro was introduced in 2011. This range later underwent a facelift which debuted in April 2019 in Japan. The exterior has been redesigned with a trapezoidal-shaped grill, projector headlamps, and a new stylish bumper. The interior features a new two-spoke steering wheel, and a 4.2-inch Multi Information Display (MID), as well as other options. The N04 4.0-liter diesel engine has also remain unchanged, including standard and full-hybrid options.

Indonesian version 
Hino Motors continues to offer the 300 "Dutro", it received a new update to the Indonesian market in 2011, and comes with new safety equipment and interior.

M series (North America)
The redesigned range were revealed in North America as a 2021 model year on October 28, 2019. The Class 4 and 5 range finally renamed as the M series, coinciding with the launch of the Class 7 and 8 XL series along with the Class 6 and 7 L series.

Engines
Japanese models get three versions of the 4-liter engine, while North American models only get the larger engine. Hybrid variants are also available.

References

External links
 
 Hino Dutro 

Hybrid trucks
Dutro
Cab over vehicles
Vehicles introduced in 1999

de:Hino Dutro